Bradshaw is an unincorporated community located in central Jackson County, Kentucky, United States. The community is located on US Route 421 at its intersection with Kentucky Route 587, 3 miles east of McKee, the county seat. 

A post office was established in the community in 1907, but it was closed in 1938.

References

Unincorporated communities in Jackson County, Kentucky
Unincorporated communities in Kentucky